Mark A. Krasnow is a Professor of Biochemistry at Stanford University School of Medicine. He earned his B.S. in Biology and Chemistry from the University of Illinois in 1978, his Ph.D. in biochemistry in 1983, and his M.D. in 1985 from The University of Chicago under the guidance of Nicholas R. Cozzarelli. He did his postdoctoral work on the Ultrabithorax gene with David Hogness at Stanford University. He has been a professor at Stanford since 1988 and is currently the chair of the program. His research is focused on understanding the molecular, genetic, and cellular mechanisms of tracheal development using drosophila and mice. He has been a Howard Hughes Medical Institute (HHMI) investigator since 1997 and is a Fellow of the American Association for the Advancement of Science and the American Academy of Arts and Sciences. He has been elected as the National Academy of Medicine in 2016, and the National Academy of Sciences in 2019.

References

External links 
Stanford Bio
Howard Hughes Medical Institute bio
Krasnow Lab website

Living people
American biochemists
Howard Hughes Medical Investigators
Place of birth missing (living people)
Year of birth missing (living people)
Stanford University School of Medicine faculty
University of Chicago alumni
University of Illinois alumni
Fellows of the American Academy of Arts and Sciences
Fellows of the American Association for the Advancement of Science
Members of the National Academy of Medicine